Hahamishia Hakamerit was a weekly Israeli satirical sketch comedy television program created by , who was also the main writer of the show, and , who directed the entire run of the show. Hahamishia Hakamerit was broadcast on Israeli Channel 2 and Channel 1 between the years 1993-1997. Later on, reruns of the show were broadcast on the cable channel Bip.

The show's often surreal skits were characterized by a satirical point of view which did not spare the audience sensitive subjects such as politics, national security, the Holocaust and sex.

Another characteristic of the show's sketches was that occasionally they had an unclear point or punch line.

Following the success of the show, similar sketch comedy programs were produced on Israeli television.  Unlike Hahamishia Hakamerits humor, which was considered at the time to be blatant, insensible, full of black humor and cynicism, these subsequent shows followed a line much closer to the Israeli-Jewish mainstream.

Cast
  (שי אביבי)
 Rami Heuberger (רמי הויברגר)
 Keren Mor (קרן מור)
  (דב נבון)
  (מנשה נוי)

External links

Israeli television series
Channel 2 (Israeli TV channel) original programming
1990s Israeli television series
1993 Israeli television series debuts
1997 Israeli television series endings